The Analogue Pocket is an FPGA-based handheld game console designed and manufactured by Analogue, Inc.; it was announced on October 16, 2019 and released on December 13, 2021. It is designed to play games designed for handhelds of the fourth generation of video game consoles and earlier generations.

Design
The device features a design inspired by the Nintendo Game Boy, including a physical cartridge slot at the rear of the console. Additional connectivity is provided via microSD card support and USB-C connectivity. Support for wireless controllers and HDMI output is also available through a proprietary docking solution.

The Analogue Pocket is designed around an Altera Cyclone V field-programmable gate array, which it uses to replicate the hardware of the Game Boy, Game Boy Color and Game Boy Advance handheld consoles.
Adapters are also available which allows the use of Game Gear, Neo Geo Pocket, Neo Geo Pocket Color and Atari Lynx game cartridges. This FPGA is also open for developers to create other "cores". The Analogue Pocket includes an additional FPGA for system management.

Release
The Analogue Pocket was announced on October 16, 2019. Its release was delayed three separate times since the initial Pocket press release. Analogue cited global chip shortages due to the COVID-19 pandemic as the reason for the product’s delay until December 2021.

Hardware 
The Analogue Pocket has the following hardware specifications

Awards
Analogue Pocket won a Red Dot Design Award in 2022
Analogue Pocket was nominated for Wallpaper 2019 Design Awards. Pocket was also awarded two Fast Company awards for Best Product Design of 2020 and Best Design Innovations of 2020 in the North America region.

References

External links
 

2020s toys
2021 in video gaming
Products introduced in 2021
Handheld game consoles
Analogue (company) products
Impact of the COVID-19 pandemic on the video game industry
Eighth-generation video game consoles
Video game console clones
FPGA-based video game consoles
Unlicensed Nintendo hardware